North Korea competed at the 2016 Summer Paralympics in Rio de Janeiro, Brazil, from 7 September to 18 September 2016.

Athletics 

Two North Korean athletes participated at the Rio Games.  One is female discus thrower Song Kum-jong(송금정).

Men's Track

Women's Field

See also 
North Korea at the 2016 Summer Olympics

References 

Nations at the 2016 Summer Paralympics
2016
2016 in North Korean sport